George Beacher Smith (7 February 1921 – 14 July 2013) was an English footballer who played in the inside forward position. He played for Manchester City and Chesterfield between 1946 and 1958.

Smith was born in Fleetwood, Lancashire. He signed for Manchester City in May 1938, but had to wait until 1946 before making his debut in an official first-team match because of World War II. He went on to play 166 league games for City, and scored 75 goals. In October 1951, he moved to Chesterfield, where he spent the rest of his professional career. He played 250 league games and scored 98 league goals for the Spireites. After leaving Chesterfield in 1958, he joined non-league Mossley.

In 1946, he scored all four goals in a Manchester derby win against United, who were sharing City's ground, Maine Road, after United's ground, Old Trafford, suffered bomb damage.

After finishing his playing career he assumed management responsibilities. In 1964 he became Manager of football team Prestwich Heys A.F.C., currently a semi-professional football club based in Prestwich, Greater Manchester, England.

Football performance
After the outbreak of war in September 1939 - and suspension of the Football League a year later - he made his senior appearance in a wartime fixture, against Stockport County in December 1939. In August 1944, following his return to Manchester from wartime service in South Africa, he scored a hat-trick against Tranmere Rovers F.C. for City in their opening match of the new season. This was Smith's first appearance in City's first team since 25th April 1942, as in the meantime his football career had been interrupted due to his Military service. 

In 1946, Smith scored all four goals in City's 4-1 win during a famous Manchester derby win against United. The match was watched by over 62,000, and scoring all four goals - three of the four in seven minutes – lead to him being designated Man of the Match. After scoring 45 goals in 90 wartime games for City, he won a Division Two championship medal in 1946-7, notably scoring five goals for City in the game against Newport County at the end of that season. 

In addition to the aforementioned wartime games, Smith also scored 80 goals in 179 peacetime City appearances. 

The following tabulated summary shows Smith's games played and goals scored for each season after the war when he played for Manchester City. Not bad, eh? 
 *** Season 1945/46 - Played 4,  Scored  3 Goals
 *** Season 1946/47 - Played 42, Scored 23 Goals
 *** Season 1947/48 - Played 42, Scored 15 Goals
 *** Season 1948/49 - Played 33, Scored 12 Goals
 *** Season 1949/50 - Played 15, Scored  6 Goals
 *** Season 1950/51 - Played 40, Scored 21 Goals
 *** Season 1951/52 - Played 3,  Scored  3 Goals
Note that between 1939 and 1946 normal competitive football was suspended in England. Smith signed up to serve in the Military and so missed playing in much of the war seasons. The Football League and FA Cup were suspended and in their place regional league competitions were set up. Appearances in these tournaments do not count in players' official records.

Chesterfield et al
In October 1951 he bid farewell to City and moved to Chesterfield for a transfer fee of £5,000. Here he spent the majority of his remaining football-playing career. He played 250 league games for Chesterfield (nicknamed the Spireites) and scored 98 league goals for the team. After leaving Chesterfield in 1958, he joined non-league Mossley in the role of player-manager. 
Later in his football career he assumed additional management responsibilities. He was player-manager with Hyde United, for example, and in 1964 he became Manager of football team Prestwich Heys A.F.C. - a semi-professional football club based in Prestwich, Greater Manchester, England.

Army & FA Representative XIs
Smith joined the armed forces but before he left Manchester he did manage to make two first team appearances in the war league. Both games were score draws with Stockport County. 
During the Second World War he also played in Army and FA representative sides. Having been badly injured by a gunshot wound during the war whilst serving in South Africa, Smith was in the habit of playing with one sleeve of his football shirt pulled down over his injured hand to avoid drawing attention to the wound. The gunshot wound was sustained by Smith while in active service in East Africa. Smith was a sergeant on secondment with the King's African Rifles when his unit was mistakenly strafed by the South African airforce. A bullet entered his right arm above his elbow, travelled down his arm, past his elbow and came out again after travelling a good six or so inches through his arm. The gunfire was from an airplane belonging to the South African Air Force, in what was classified as an incident of friendly fire.

Career in later life
After Smith's move to Chesterfield in October 1951, he accepted the positions of player-manager at both Mossley and Hyde United. Smith was the first Spireite (Chesterfield player) to appear in a light entertainment program on TV. He made a guest appearance in a "This is Your Life" tribute to former Man United Manager Matt Busby in 1958. 

In 1958 Smith returned to Manchester. There he worked until retirement in Kennings Auto Centre' department in the city of Manchester as Manager of the tyre store. The last five years of Smith’s life were spent in a retirement home, namely Spurr House retirement home in Unsworth.

Goodbye to all that
Smith died after a stay at the Fairfield Hospital in Bury, UK. Coincidentally, Smith died within a week of his good friend and team mate, Manchester City goalkeeper, Bert Trautmann, who died at the age of 89 on 19 July 2013. 

George Beacher Smith died peacefully on Sunday 14 July 2013, aged 92.

References

Further reading
Rippon, A (2005) Gas Masks for Goal Posts: Football in Britain During the Second World War 

1921 births
2013 deaths
British Army personnel of World War II
English footballers
Association football inside forwards
Manchester City F.C. players
Chesterfield F.C. players
People from Fleetwood
Mossley A.F.C. players